The Women's 48 kg competition at the 2017 World Weightlifting Championships was held on 29 November 2017.

Schedule

Medalists

Records

 Nurcan Taylan's world record was rescinded in 2021.

Results

References

External links
Results 

Women's 48 kg
2017 in women's weightlifting